James Fraser,  (21 December 1896 – 5 November 1975) was an Australian rules footballer who played with Carlton in the Victorian Football League (VFL). 

Before his football career Fraser served with distinction in World War I, being awarded the Military Medal in October 1917 for "bravery in the field".

Notes

External links 

Jim Fraser's profile at Blueseum

1896 births
1975 deaths
Australian military personnel of World War I
Australian recipients of the Military Medal
Australian rules footballers from Victoria (Australia)
Carlton Football Club players
Mansfield Football Club players
Military personnel from Victoria (Australia)